Eileen Kernaghan (born January 6, 1939) is a Canadian novelist and three-time winner of the Prix Aurora Award for English-language Canadian speculative fiction. The settings of her historical fantasy novels range from the prehistoric Indus Valley and eighteenth century Bhutan, to Elizabethan England and nineteenth century Scandinavia. She lives in New Westminster, British Columbia.

Biography
Eileen Kernaghan grew up on a dairy farm outside Grindrod, B.C., Canada, population 600. The reading material she found on the family shelves - Greek myths, historical novels, G. A. Henty's boys' adventure books, a collection of Weird Tales and Thrilling Wonder Stories - helped to shape her writing career.

Her first published story, written when she was twelve, appeared in the Vancouver Sun newspaper. It earned her a byline, an illustration, and a cheque for $12.65. Her next appearance in print, twenty years later, was with a cover story in the New York science fiction magazine Galaxy. She went on to write the "Grey Isles" series, a Bronze Age trilogy based on the origins of Stonehenge. Journey to Aprilioth, Songs from the Drowned Lands and The Sarsen Witch were published by Ace Books during the 1980s.

As for her day jobs, they've included elementary school teaching, arts administration, operating a used bookstore with her husband Pat, and, for many years, teaching creative writing at Shadbolt Centre for the Arts in Burnaby, and Port Moody's Kyle Centre. She has three adult children and four grandchildren.

Bibliography
 The Grey Isles sequence:
 Journey to Aprilioth (1980). New York: Ace. . 
 Songs from the Drowned Lands (1983). New York: Ace. . 
 The Sarsen Witch (1989). New York: Ace. .
 Dance of the Snow Dragon (1995). Saskatoon, Sask: Thistledown Press. . 
 The Snow Queen (2000). Saskatoon, Sask: Thistledown Press. . 
 The Alchemist's Daughter (2004). Saskatoon, Sask: Thistledown Press. . 
 Winter on the Plain of Ghosts: a novel of Mohenjo-daro (2004). New Westminster, BC: Flying Monkey Press. .
 Wild Talent: A Novel of the Supernatural (2008). Historical fantasy: YA age 14+. Thistledown Press.  .
 Tales from the Holograph Woods: Speculative Poetry (2009). Wattle and Daub Books. 
 Dragon-Rain and Other Stories (Kindle Edition) (2013) Neville Books/Flying Monkey Press. Dragon Rain and Other Stories at Amazon.com
Sophie, in Shadow (2014). Historical fantasy: YA age 14+. Thistledown Press. .

References

Sources

External links
 
 Eileen Kernaghan's blog
 

Strange Horizons interview of Kernaghan (2005; archived 2007)
 Review of Dragon-Rain and Other Stories by R. Graeme Cameron, Amazing Stories, August 2020

Canadian fantasy writers
Canadian women novelists
20th-century Canadian novelists
21st-century Canadian novelists
Living people
1939 births
Women science fiction and fantasy writers
20th-century Canadian women writers
21st-century Canadian women writers